Joyce Mary Jacobs (née Penn; 15 April 1922 – 15 September 2013) was an English-born Australian character actress, and comedienne who had a successful career on the small screen, in soap opera and serials, after emigrating there from her native England in 1962.

She remains best known for her portrayals of elderly gossips she appeared in serial Number 96 as a speaking extra, often referred to as Mrs. Carson or Daisy, and appeared briefly in The Young Doctors as Muriel Cover.

She remains best known however for her more permanent long running role on soap opera A Country Practice, as Esme Watson for 12 years and 805 episodes, normally appearing on screen alongside fellow veteran actors Syd Heylen and Gordon Piper, although, unlike the latter actors who were written out of the series toward the end of its run on Network Seven to make way for a younger revamped cast, she was retained in the series when it switched to Network Ten.

Biography

Early life and career
Jacobs was born one of three siblings in Carshalton, Surrey, England to Leonard Watson Penn and Dora Elsie (née Ferrett) Penn.

She did not embark on a professional acting career until arriving in Australia in 1962. During the 1970s, Jacobs played the small, recurring role of Mrs. Carson in Number 96 and Muriel Palmer on The Young Doctors.

A Country Practice (Seven Network)
In 1981, Jacobs appeared on the pilot episode of A Country Practice, as a character in the medical clinic called Norma, after which she returned to the series donning Edna Everage style glasses and playing Esme Watson on the long-running Seven Network series. She was originally a semi-regular, but became a regular, starting with Episode 99 in 1982. Having worked on the series for 12 years, she was one of the show's longest-serving actresses. She remained with the show alongside Brian Wenzel and Shane Porteous until it ended in 1993.

A Country Practice (Network Ten)
In 1994, Network Ten continued the series under the same title, but with a new setting and a mostly new cast. Jacobs, however, along with Joan Sydney (as matron) and Andrew Blackman as Dr. Harry Morrison reprised her role of Esme Watson. The new version was not as successful as the original and was cancelled after 30 episodes. She appeared in the short film, Heaven on the 4th Floor, in 1998 opposite Bunney Brooke. She appeared in a guest episode on G.P. and in the 1986 television movie Hector's Bunyip.She appeared on a guest appearance on All Saints in 2000.

Personal life
After retirement, in an interview with the magazine Woman's Day in 2012 she revealed that he had been battling Parkinson's disease for 10 years. After her husband of 64 years, David Ian Hutchinson Jacobs, died in 2011, she resided in a rest home facility, Goodhew Gardens, Taren Point, where she celebrated her 90th birthday with fellow cast members.

Jacobs died aged 91, on 21 September 2013.

Filmography

Television

References

External links
 
 Notice of death of actress Joyce Jacobs, article.wn.com; accessed 22 September 2015.
Notice of death of Joyce Jacobs, news.com.au; accessed 22 September 2015.

1922 births
2013 deaths
Australian television actresses
British emigrants to Australia
Actresses from Surrey
Actresses from New South Wales
20th-century Australian actresses
21st-century Australian actresses
Deaths from Parkinson's disease
Neurological disease deaths in New South Wales
20th-century English women
20th-century English people